Aparahnam is a 1991 Indian Malayalam-language film directed and produced by M. P. Sukumaran Nair. The film stars Babu Antony, Kaviyoor Ponnamma, Ashwathy and M. Chandran Nair.

Plot

Cast
Babu Antony as Nandakumar
Kaviyoor Ponnamma
Ashwathy
M. Chandran Nair
Murali
Krishnankutty Nair
Babu Namboothiri
Jalaja
N. L. Balakrishnan
Vembayam Thampi

References

External links
 

1991 films
1990s Malayalam-language films
Films scored by Jerry Amaldev